Nordic Center Youth (Swedish: Nordiska Centerungdomens Förbund) is a Nordic political organisation for centrist youth and student organisations. It was founded in 1965 and today has 16 000 individual members.

NCF's working language is English.

There are nine member organisations in NCF.

List of member organisations 

The board of the organisation in 2022–2023 is as follows:

References 

Liberal organizations
Nordic organizations
Political youth organizations
Centrism in Europe